Tamarack Golf Club is a public golf course located in Labrador City, Newfoundland and Labrador, Canada. It was established in 1968.

The Course
The 18-hole course is located on the shore of Duley Lake and only 10 minutes from Labrador City.

See also
List of golf courses in Newfoundland and Labrador

References

External links
Official website

Golf clubs and courses in Newfoundland and Labrador